Achille Loria (March 2, 1857 in Mantua – November 6, 1943) was an Italian political economist.

He was educated at the lyceum of his native city and the universities of Bologna, Pavia, Rome, Berlin, and London and graduated at the University of Bologna (1877). He became professor of political economy in the University of Siena in 1881; and he held a similar appointment in the University of Padua (1891–1903), and University of Torino (1903–1932). He was elected to the Accademia dei Licei (1901) and appointed to the Italian Senate in 1919. His work draws on a wide range of predecessors: Karl Marx, Herbert Spencer, Charles Darwin, Adolph Wagner and Luigi Cossa, who was his teacher. With this background and on the basis of research on landholding in the British Museum he developed an original deterministic theory of economic development. It is based on the premise that the relative scarcity of land leads to the subjugation of some members of society by others, a mechanism that works differently in different stages of development. This concept was developed in a large number of books, many of which were translated into foreign languages. They had an indirectly influenced their interpretation of American history. Achille Loria is also seen as a forerunner of socio-legal studies (see International Institute for the Sociology of Law).

Loria was one of the earliest critics of Marx's ideas, and as such his views were ridiculed by Friedrich Engels and Antonio Gramsci.

English language bibliography 
 Achille Loria, The Economic Foundations of Society, London: Sonnenschein 1904.
 Achille Loria, Contemporary Social Problems, London: Sonnenschein 1911
 Achille Loria, The Economic Synthesis: A Study of the Laws of Income, London: Allen and Unwin 1914
 Lee Benson, Turner and Beard: American Historical Writing Reconsidered. Glencoe, Ill.: Free Press 1950 (see pages 2–40 on "Achille Loria's influence on American Economic thought").
Shepard B. Clough, "Loria, Achille". In: International Encyclopedia of the Social Sciences'', vol. 9/10, New York 1972, pp. 474–475.

References

External links

1867 births
1943 deaths
19th-century Italian Jews
20th-century Italian Jews
Italian economists
Italian sociologists
University of Bologna alumni
University of Pavia alumni
Alumni of the University of London
Academic staff of the University of Siena
Academic staff of the University of Padua